Greg Lisher (born 29 November 1963) is the lead guitar player for Camper Van Beethoven. He is also one of the founding members of the Camper Van Beethoven spin-off Indy prog rock group Monks of Doom.

He has also released three solo records. His first release, Handed Down the Wire was released in 2001 followed by the release of Trains Change in 2007. His latest release, the instrumental record Songs From the Imperial Garden was released in 2020.

Discography

with Camper Van Beethoven

Albums 

 II & III (1986)
 Camper Van Beethoven (1986)
 Vampire Can Mating Oven (1987)
 Our Beloved Revolutionary Sweetheart (1988)
 Key Lime Pie (1989)
 Tusk (2002)
 New Roman Times (2004)
 La Costa Perdida (2013)
 El Camino Real (2014)

Compilations and Special Releases 

 The Virgin Years (1993) (Camper Van Beethoven and Cracker)
 Camper Vantiquities (1993) – rarities compilation
 Cigarettes & Carrot Juice: The Santa Cruz Years (2002) – box set
 In the Mouth of the Crocodile – Live in Seattle (2004) – live album
 Discotheque CVB: Live In Chicago (2005) – live EP
 Camper Van Beethoven Is Dead. Long Live Camper Van Beethoven (2000) – rarities

with Monks of Doom 

 Soundtrack to the Film "Breakfast on the Beach of Deception" (1987)
 The Cosmodemonic Telegraph Company (1989)
 Meridian (1991)
 The Insect God (EP, 1992)
 Forgery (1993)
 What's Left For Kicks? (2004)
 The Brönte Pin (2017)

Solo albums 

 Handed Down the Wire (2001)
 Trains Change (2007)
 Songs From the Imperial Garden (2020)

Other recordings (as guitarist ) 
Jonathan Segel – Storytelling (1989)

The Electric Chairmen – Toast (1996

Jonathan Segel – Edgy Not Antsy (2003)

With Victor Krummenacher 

Victory Out in the Heat (1995)

Saint John's Mercy (1998)

The Cock Crows at Sunrise (2007)

Patriarch's Blues (2008)

Blue Pacific (2018)

Filthy thieving bastards A Melody of Retreads and Broken Quills (2001)

Camper van Chadbourne (1987)

External links
 Greg Lisher collection at the Internet Archive's live music archive

 Camper Van Beethoven (official website)
 Monks of Doom (official website)
 greglisher.com (official website)
 Bandcamp
 Facebook

Living people
1963 births
American rock guitarists
American male guitarists
20th-century American guitarists
Camper Van Beethoven members
Monks of Doom members
Filthy Thieving Bastards members
20th-century American male musicians